Freek is the debut album by Keller Williams, released in 1994.  It contains mostly solo arrangements of his early tracks.

Track listing
 The Juggler  3:11  
 Turn in Difference 3:22  
 Friendly Pyramid 4:13  
 In the Middle 4:37  
 Chillin' 4:18  
 The Miss Annie Overture in A  :35  
 Passapatanzy  3:35  
 Shapes of Change 4:31  
 The River 10:38  
 A Day That Never Was  4:01
 Get on Up/Sanford and Son  6:36

Personnel
John Alagía - Producer, Engineer  
Doug Derryberry - Producer, Engineer  
Dave Glasser - Mastering  
Thane Kerner - Cover Design  
Scott Martin - Photography 
Charlie Burns - Creative Director 
Freky Aziz Reffelruz - Background Dancer
Keller Williams - Guitar, Percussion, Harp, Vocals, Guitar (12 String), Producer, Engineer
Clif Franck - Drums
Brian Durrett - Bass

References

1994 albums
Keller Williams albums